DTFC may refer to one of the following association football clubs:

In England:
Cannons Wood F.C., formerly named DTFC
Darlaston Town F.C.
Daventry Town F.C.
Deal Town F.C.
Dereham Town F.C.
Desborough Town F.C.
Devizes Town F.C.
Didcot Town F.C.
Dinnington Town F.C.
Desborough Town F.C.
Diss Town F.C.
Dorchester Town F.C.
Downham Town F.C.
Dudley Town F.C.
Dunstable Town F.C.
Dronfield Town F.C.

In Scotland:
Dalkeith Thistle F.C.
Dalry Thistle F.C.

In New Zealand:
Dunedin Technical F.C.